Innovation Pavilion is a business incubator founded by Vic Ahmed in Centennial, Colorado in 2011. The incubator describes itself as an ecosystem for entrepreneurs and is modeled after Plug and Play, a Silicon Valley startup incubator. The Pavilion houses member companies in technology, digital health, media, entertainment, marketing and finance, operating from a startup level to seasoned professionals. The incubator has also held several Youth Entrepreneur programs with the Denver Youth Entrepreneurship Network.

The building itself, was purchased in 2013, in a strategic partnership between Innovation Pavilion and Northstar Commercial Partners, with plans to open more incubators. Northstar, a privately held commercial real estate firm, is headquartered in Denver.

The Innovation Pavilion hosts the monthly meetings for the Opportunity Coalition, a nonprofit organization focused on entrepreneurship in Colorado.

The Innovation Pavilion space has been listed for lease amidst allegations of sexual assault of founder Vic Ahmed.

On November 13, 2019, Thrive Workplace has announce they will be opening their fourth location in the former space that was once home to Innovation Pavilion.

Investments
As one of their funding mechanisms, Innovation Pavilion offers endorsements to startups on the peer-to-peer microlending platform, Kiva Zip.

Member companies
Cloud Elements – an API Management Service that developers use to integrate, monitor and maintain leading cloud services.
CLVR – an interactive video company.

References

External links
Wondra, Jan. "Innovation, Passion, Collaboration." The Villager. Retrieved May 26, 2016.

Business incubators of the United States
Companies established in 2011
Companies based in Centennial, Colorado
Companies based in Colorado